"The New Pollution" is a song by American musician Beck, released as the third single from his fifth album, Odelay (1996). It samples the song "Venus" by Joe Thomas. In the US, the song peaked at number 78 on the Billboard Hot 100 and number nine on the Billboard Alternative Airplay chart. In Europe, it was a Top 10 hit in Iceland, peaking at number nine.

Critical reception
Justin Chadwick from Albumism picked "The New Pollution" as one of the "unequivocal standouts" of the Odelay album, describing it as "buoyant" and "exhilarating, pop-friendly fare". British magazine Music Week rated the song four out of five, adding, "Similar to Devils Haircut in execution, this mellow outing from Odelay should follow its predecessor into the Top 30." Editor Alan Jones called it a gem, adding, "Like the hit Devils Haircut, it sounds very tongue in cheek and combines the psychedelic swirl of The Beatles' Within You, Without You with the bass line from Taxman, although it doesn't really sound like a Beatles record. It does have their freshness and is very commercial and is sure to score." David Sinclair from The Times viewed it as a "sneaky re-working of that old Taxman riff."

Music video
The accompanying music video for "The New Pollution" was directed by Beck himself. It features 1960s-style dancing and background. The video contains visual references to Serge Gainsbourg's music videos for "Monsieur William" and "Melody", as well as the bands Mötley Crüe and Kraftwerk. The opening scene references The Lawrence Welk Show.

The video features actress Mary Lynn Rajskub.

The music video received nominations for Video of the Year, Best Alternative Video, Best Direction, Best Choreography and Best Art Direction at the 1997 MTV Video Music Awards, winning the latter three.

Live performances
As of January 13, 2019, Beck had performed the song live 374 times.

Track listings

 US 12" Vinyl
 "The New Pollution" [LP Version] - 3:39
 "The New Pollution" [Remix by Mickey P.] - 4:08
 "The New Pollution" [Remix by Mkey P. & Mario C.] - 3:49
 "Lemonade" [Previously Unreleased] - 2:22
 "Richard's Hairpiece" ["Devil's Haircut" remix by Aphex Twin] - 3:19

 UK CD Pt. 1
 "The New Pollution" [LP Version] - 3:42
 "Richard's Hairpiece" [Remix by Aphex Twin] - 3:21
 "Electric Music and the Summer People" - 4:41

 UK CD Pt. 2
 "The New Pollution" [LP Version] - 3:42
 "The New Pollution" [Remix by Mario C. and Mickey P.] - 3:51
 "Lemonade" - 2:21

 Japanese CD (released as "The New Pollution" and Other Favorites)
 "The New Pollution" [LP Version] - 3:39
 "The New Pollution" [Remix by Mickey P.] - 4:08
 "The New Pollution" [Remix by Mario C. & Mickey P.] - 3:49
 "Richard's Hairpiece" [Remix by Aphex Twin] - 3:21
 "Thunderpeel" [Previously Unreleased] - 2:41
 This version is different from the one on Stereopathetic Soulmanure
 "Lemonade" [Previously Unreleased] - 2:23
 ".000.000" [Previously Unreleased] - 5:26
 "Feather In Your Cap" [Previously Unreleased] - 3:45
 This version can be found on the SubUrbia soundtrack.

Personnel
Beck Hansen: Vocals, guitar, bass, clavinet, organ, programming
The Dust Brothers: Programming
Written by: Beck/The Dust Brothers

Charts

References

External links

Beck songs
1996 songs
1997 singles
Songs written by Beck
Song recordings produced by Dust Brothers
Songs written by John King (record producer)
Songs written by Michael Simpson (producer)
DGC Records singles
MTV Video Music Award for Best Direction